"Never Alone" is a song by Dutch Eurodance group 2 Brothers on the 4th Floor. It was released in November 1993 as the third single from their debut album, Dreams (1994). Produced by brothers Martin and Bobby Boer, it is their first single featuring rapper D-Rock and singer Des'Ray. It was a number-one hit in Brazil, Israel and South Africa. In the group's native Netherlands, the single peaked at number two. In 2014, new remixes of the song by JoeySuki and Jonathan Pitch were released.

Background
In a broadcast on Dutch radio in January 1994, 2 Brothers on the 4th Floor said about the song,

Chart performance
"Never Alone" was one of the group's most successful singles, charting on the charts on several continents. In Europe, it peaked at number two in the group's native Netherlands, being held off reaching the top spot by Paul de Leeuw/Annie De Rooy's "Ik Wil Niet Dat Je Liegt/Waarheen Waarvoor". It spent three weeks at that position and ten weeks inside the top 10. The single also peaked in the top 10 in Belgium, reaching number three. Additionally, it was a top 40 hit in Sweden, as well as on the Eurochart Hot 100, where it peaked at number 31 in February 1994. Outside Europe, "Never Alone" peaked at number-one in Brazil, Israel (February 1994) and South Africa.

Critical reception
Larry Flick from American music magazine Billboard commented that the song "is a pure, unabashed hi-NRG anthem, pumpin' with a throaty vamp by Des'Ray and a perfunctory rap by D-Rock. This one is scant seconds away from exploding worldwide—and it is still available for U.S. picking. Act fast..." Maria Jimenez from Music & Media described the group's sound as "a pumped sound somewhere between Culture Beat and 2 Unlimited", and added that "the familiar male rapper/female singer combination" drive their album Dreams.

Music video
A black-and-white music video was produced to promote the single. It features D-Rock and Des'Ray performing on the beach in Mexico. In between, different local people appear. The video was later published on YouTube in April 2010. By September 2020, it had more than 3,7 million views.

Track listing
 12", Netherlands (1993)
"Never Alone" (Club Mix)
"Dancin' Together" (Cowboy Dub)
"Never Alone" (Exxtended Mix)

 CD single, Netherlands (1993)
"Never Alone" (Euro Radio Mix) – 4:11
"Never Alone" (US Radio Mix) – 3:34

 CD maxi, Germany (1993)
"Never Alone" (Euro Radio Mix) – 4:11
"Never Alone" (US Radio Mix) – 3:34
"Never Alone" (Club Mix) – 5:20
"Never Alone" (Extended Euro Mix) – 5:48
"Dancin' Together" (Cowboy Dub) – 3:41
"Never Alone" (Brothers Edit) – 5:08

Charts

Weekly charts

Year-end charts

References

1993 singles
1993 songs
2 Brothers on the 4th Floor songs
Black-and-white music videos
Electro songs
English-language Dutch songs
Number-one singles in Israel
Songs against racism and xenophobia
ZYX Music singles